The China Lions is a professional rugby union team  that was formed in 2020 to compete in the Global Rapid Rugby competition across the Asia-Pacific region. It is a joint venture between the China Rugby Football Association and New Zealand's Bay of Plenty Rugby Union.

History
For their first season in 2020 the Lions intended to host three of their home games in China at Shanghai and two in New Zealand at the Rotorua International Stadium. Due to health concerns relating to the COVID-19 pandemic, however, the Lions only played one match in the schedule, a 29–22 away win over the Fijian Latui in Suva.

Records

Head coaches
 Mike Rogers  (2020)

Captains
 Hugh Blake (2020)

Squads
China Lions – 2020 Global Rapid Rugby     

  
  Greg Pleasants-Tate
  Nic Souchon
  
  Nico Aandewiel
  Haereiti Hetet
  Tevita Mafileo
  Solomona Sakalia
  Tevita Sole
  Apitoni Toia
  Viliami Leo Tosi
  
  Li Haitao
  Iosefa Maloney-Fiaola
  Ray Tatafu
  Stan van den Hoven
  
  Hugh Blake (c)
  Kohan Herbert
  Joe Johnston
  Liu Luda
  Hoani Matenga
  Abraham Papali'i
  Gao Yinghao
  
  Luke Campbell
  Leroy Carter
  Te Aihe Toma
  
  Dan Hollinshead
  Solofa Silipa
  Dwayne Sweeney
    
  Joe Johnston
  James Little
  Mathew Skipwith-Garland
    
  Declan Barnett
  Tyler Campbell
  Dan Changshun
  Fa'asiu Fuatai
    
  Pryor Collier
  Liam Coombes-Fabling

Notes:

Bold denotes player is internationally capped.

See also
Rugby union in China

References

External links
 China Lions

Chinese rugby union teams
New Zealand rugby union teams
Global Rapid Rugby teams
Rugby clubs established in 2020
Rugby union clubs disestablished in 2020
2020 disestablishments in China